The boys' 1000 metres in short track speed skating at the 2016 Winter Youth Olympics was held on 14 February at the Gjøvik Olympic Cavern Hall.

Results 
 QAB – qualified for the semifinals A/B
 QCD – qualified for the semifinals C/D
 PEN – penalty
 ADA – advanced

Quarterfinals

Semifinals

Semifinals C/D 
 QC – qualified for Final C
 QD – qualified for Final D
 PEN – penalty

Semifinals A/B 
 QA – qualified for Final A
 QB – qualified for Final B

Finals

Final D

Final C

Final B

Final A

References 

Boys' 1000m